MDV may refer to:
 Maldives, ISO 3166-1 alpha-3 country code
MDV (TV station), Australian television station
The IATA code for Omboué Hospital Airport
The IOC code for Maldives Olympic Committee
MDV Commercial Air Conditioner, Midea Group brand (active since 1999).
Mitteldeutscher Verkehrsverbund (MDV), Transport and Tariff Association in the German Leipzig-Halle (Saale) area
Michael de Vletter, high-profile member of the LSM Police Force
Marek's disease virus